Muhammad Miyan Deobandi (4 October 1903 - 24 October 1975) was an Indian Sunni Islamic scholar, academic, historian, freedom struggle activist, who served as the fifth general secretary of the Jamiat Ulama-e-Hind. He wrote books such as Aseeraan-e-Malta, Ulama-e-Hind Ka Shaandar Maazi and Ulama-e-Haqq Aur Unke Mujahidana Karname.

Biography
Muhammad Miyan Deobandi was born Muzaffar Miyan on 4 October 1903 in Deoband. He began his studies at home and read the Qur'an from his maternal grandmother. He studied some books of Persian and Urdu with Khalīl Aḥmad in Muzaffarnagar. In 1916, Miyan Deobandi entered the Persian class of the Darul Uloom Deoband and graduated in the traditional dars-e-nizami in 1925. His teachers include Anwar Shah Kashmiri, Asghar Hussain Deobandi, Izaz Ali Amrohi and Shabbir Ahmad Usmani. He was a disciple of Hussain Ahmad Madani.

Muhammad Miyan started taught at the Madrasa Hanfiyah in Arrah, Bihar for two years from 1926 to 1928. He later taught at the Madrasa Shahi in Moradabad for a span of sixteen years, starting from March 1928. During these sixteen years, Muhammad Miyan served as a Mufti, rector and as a teacher. After 1947, he shifted to Delhi permanently, and was appointed as the member of the executive council of Madrasa Shahi. In 1380 AH, he was appointed as the honorary rector of the Shahi, and later in 1395 AH made the rector.

In 1930, Muhammad Miyan was appointed as the secretary of the Moradabad unit of the Jamiat Ulama-e-Hind (JUH). Later, he served as the secretary of the Agra and Awadh units of the JUH. He also served as the secretary of preaching department of JUH Agra. On 7 May 1945, he was appointed as the secretary of the JUH, and as the general secretary after the death of Hifzur Rahman Seoharwi; a post he served for a year only, resigning a year later. He was then appointed as a member of the JUH's general body, secretary of Jamiat Trust, and the manager of Idāra Mabahith-e-Fiqhiyyah in Delhi. He was appointed as the senior Hadīth professor and senior Mufti of the Madrasa Aminia, where he served until his death in 1975.

Muhammad Miyan died in Delhi on 24 October 1975, aged 72. He is referred as Mu'arrikh-e-Millat for his historical works. His followers refer him as Sayyid-ul-Millat. His students include Mufti Mahmud, Athar Mubarakpuri and Asir Adrawi.

Literary works
Muhammad Miyan Deobandi's works include:
 Ahd-e-Zarrin awr Misali Hukumatein 
 Aseeran-e-Malta
 Mishkat al-Athaar
 Shah Abdul Aziz: Afkaar-o-Khidmaat
 Panipat aur Buzurgan-e-Panipat
 Jamiat Ulama-e-Hind Kya Hai?
 Shawahid-e-Taqaddus
 Tareekh-e-Islam
 Tehreek Reshmi Rumaal (Translated to English as Silk Letter Movement) by Muhammadullah Qasmi).
 Ulama-e-Hind Ka Shandaar Maazi (2 volumes) 
 Ulama-e-Haqq Aur Unke Mujahidana Karname (2 volumes)
 Waliullahi Tehreek

See also
 List of Indian writers

References

Bibliography
 

20th-century Muslim scholars of Islam
1903 births
1975 deaths
Deobandis
Indian Sunni Muslim scholars of Islam
Indian historians of Islam
People from Deoband
Indian independence activists from Uttar Pradesh
Darul Uloom Deoband alumni
20th-century Indian historians
Students of Anwar Shah Kashmiri